Statistics of the 1994–95 Saudi First Division.

External links 
 Saudi Arabia Football Federation
 Saudi League Statistics
 Al Jazirah 2 Apr 1995 issue 8211 

Saudi First Division League seasons
Saudi Professional League
2